Gueschart is a commune in the Somme department in Hauts-de-France in northern France. It was the target of bombing raids during the Second World War aimed at destroying nearby V1 launch sites, whose foundations can still be seen on the south-west outskirts of the village, near the D938.

Geography

Population

See also
Communes of the Somme department

References

Communes of Somme (department)